Litwinki may refer to:

Litwinki, Podlaskie Voivodeship, Poland
Litwinki, Warmian-Masurian Voivodeship, Poland